Königstuhl or Königsstuhl (King's seat) may refer to:

Geologic formations
 Königstuhl (Gurktal Alps), in the Nock Mountains of the Gurktal Alps of Austria
 Königstuhl (Odenwald), a mountain near Heidelberg in Germany
 Königsstuhl (Rügen), a chalk rock promentary on the island of Rügen in Germany
 Großer Königstuhl, near the Turracher Höhe Pass in the Gurktal Alps of Austria
 Königstuhl, the highest point on the mountain of Donnersberg in Germany

Other uses
 Königsstuhl (horse) (1976–1995), a champion race horse
 Königsstuhl von Rhens, a building along the Rheinburgenweg Trail, Rhineland-Palatinate/Hesse, Germany
 10949 Königstuhl, an asteroid named for the Odenwald mountains

See also
 Landessternwarte Heidelberg-Königstuhl, the Heidelberg-Königstuhl State [Astronomical] Observatory